Sir James Bernard Flanagan,  (15 January 1914 – 4 April 1999), was the only Roman Catholic Chief Constable of the Royal Ulster Constabulary (RUC).

Known as 'Jamie Flanagan', he was born in Derry in Ulster, the northern province in Ireland. He was raised near Killygordon, a village in the east of County Donegal in Ulster. Sir Jamie Flanagan was no relation of the other, better-known, RUC Chief Constable, Sir Ronnie Flanagan. Sir Jamie's father was a sergeant in the Royal Irish Constabulary (RIC). In 1934, Jamie Flanagan joined the RUC.

In 1961 he was promoted to County Inspector and was appointed an OBE, just before the outbreak of the Troubles, in June 1968. In June 1970 he was appointed Assistant Chief Constable and in July 1973 he was appointed a CBE, becoming Chief Constable on 1 November 1973, replacing Sir Graham Shillington. In July 1974 he survived an IRA bombing attempt on a plane he was travelling in

In June 1975 he received a knighthood and retired in April 1976.

Not a 'political' Chief
Although Flanagan avoided political comment, his tenure as Chief Constable was marked by controversy. The police, however, did not control security policy in regard to the Troubles during this period - which was instead decided by the Army. Some felt that the RUC went easy on the IRA due to being manipulated politically. Flanagan felt that some in the hierarchy of his own church treated him with a certain coolness.

Death
Sir Jamie Flanagan died on 4 April 1999, aged 85.

References

1914 births
1999 deaths
Knights Commander of the Order of the British Empire
People from Derry (city)
Chief Constables of the Royal Ulster Constabulary
Place of death missing